Ixinandria steinbachi is the only species in the genus Ixinandria of catfish (order Siluriformes) of the family Loricariidae.

Taxonomy
Ixinandria is part of the Rineloricaria group of the Loricariini tribe within the subfamily Loricariinae. The phylogenetic position of Ixinandria within the tribe Loricariini remains uncertain. It has been suggested that Ixinandria could be synonym of Rineloricaria.

Previously there were two species in this genus, but it was found that I. montebelloi was a synonym of I. steinbachi.

Distribution
The distribution of Ixinandria includes rivers of the Atlantic slope of the Andes in Bolivia and Argentina. I. steinbachi occurs in the Salado River basin. I. steinbachi occurs in Salta Province in mountainous areas at high altitudes ranging from around 1000–2900 metres (3300–9500 ft) above sea level.

Appearance and anatomy
Sexual dimorphism includes hypertrophied odontodes around the head margin and on the pectoral fin spines of mature males. These fish reach a length of  SL.

Habitat ecology
I. steinbachi is a rheophilic species that lives in fast flowing and very oxygenated waters. Its color pattern reflects mimicry with stoned bottoms. Fertilized eggs have been found on the hidden surface of a stone, suggesting that I. steinbachi could be a cavity spawner.

References

Loricariini
Catfish of South America
Freshwater fish of Argentina
Fish of Bolivia
Monotypic freshwater fish genera
Catfish genera
Taxa named by Isaäc J. H. Isbrücker
Taxa named by Han Nijssen